Dawei Yazawin is an 18th-century Burmese chronicle that covers the history of Dawei (Tavoy) region. It was written in 1795, three decades after Burma regained the region from Siam.

References

Bibliography
 

1795 non-fiction books
18th-century history books
Burmese chronicles
Tanintharyi Region